Paula Howells (born 22 March 1997) is an English footballer who plays as a midfielder for the FA Women's Championship club Lewes. She has previously played for England Under 19s and 23s and for the London Bees.

Life 
Howells was born on 22 March 1997 in Sussex and she was an Arsenal fan as a child. She admired their striker Thierry Henry and she tried to follow his style. When she was at school she suffered early with discrimination against her as a female footballer. When there was a special match when she was thirteen then the boys at her school would be allowed to miss lessons. However the girls were expected to attend normal schooling. She protested, but this made no difference, and she got into some trouble.

Club career

Brighton 
Howells played for Brighton WFC until July 2014.

London Bees 
She joined London Bees in 2014.

In 2017, Howells started playing with FA Women's Championship club London Bees playing as an attacking midfielder and making seventeen appearances. She got her only yellow card that season and she scored six goals. In the next season she scored just one goal but she was only in four line ups.

Lewes FC 

She joined Lewes for the 2019 team. The team are unusual as they pay their men's team and their women's team the same amount. The matches cost the same to see and Howell's has noted that the women and men practice together regularly. She is a midfielder who scores goals. In October 2021 she scored the opening goal against Charlton Athletic. It was a long range goal and she scored another against Coventry when her team beat them 4-1.

International career 
Howells has been capped by England at two youth levels. In 2016 she appeared for the England under-19 team; once in a draw with Sweden and again in a win over Austria.

She received her first call up for an under-23 match in 2018 for a goaless draw against the USA.

Other
Howells helped to organise her team mates to support a virtual Bingo night during the pandemic to support MindOut. MindOut is a mental health charity that supports the LGBTQ community.

References 

Living people
1997 births
English women's footballers
London Bees players
Women's Super League players
FA Women's National League players
Women's association football midfielders
Lewes F.C. Women players